Parksidan is a locality situated in Ekerö Municipality, Stockholm County, Sweden, with 494 inhabitants in 2010.

References 

Populated places in Ekerö Municipality
Uppland